Arroyo de la Luz is a municipality located in the province of Cáceres, Extremadura, Spain. According to the 2005 census (INE), the municipality has a population of 6607 inhabitants.

It was put on lockdown by regional president Guillermo Fernández Vara in March 2020 during the COVID-19 pandemic in Spain, with 15 reported cases of COVID-19.

References

Municipalities in the Province of Cáceres